Muqayyath Sha Sirguro Wakf Board College (also Muqyyath, Myqyyath, MSS) is a Muslim minority institution and the only college in India run by the Wakf Board. Established in 1964, it is the first Muslim institution, and one of the oldest academic institutions, in Madurai. The college offers eight undergraduate courses, two postgraduate courses, and an M.Phil course in one discipline in the aided stream. The college also offers five undergraduate courses, two postgraduate courses, and a postgraduate diploma and diploma in Computer Applications in the self-financing stream. It has been accredited by the National Assessment and Accreditation Council with a "B+" grade.

Academics
MSS Wakf Board College offers courses in the following areas:

Aided courses
 Bachelor of Arts (B.A.): History
 Bachelor of  Economics (B.A): Economics (English & Tamil medium)
 Bachelor of Science (B.Sc): Physics, Mathematics, Chemistry, Zoology
 Bachelor of Commerce (B.Com)
 Master of Arts (M.A.): English Literature
 Master of Commerce (M.Com)

Self-financed courses
 Bachelor of Tamil (B.A): Tamil
 Bachelor of English (B.A): English 
 Bachelor of Science (B.Sc): Computer Science, Electronics
 Bachelor of Commerce (B.Com): Commerce with Computer Application
 Bachelor of Business Administration (B.B.A.)
 Bachelor of Computer Application (B.C.A): Computer Application
 Master of Science (M.Sc): Computer Science
 Master of Science (M.S.): Information Technology & Management (IT&M)
 Master of Commerce (M.Com with Computer Application)
 Post Graduate Diploma (one year): Computer Applications (PGDCA)
 Diploma (one year): Computer Applications (DCA)
 Master of Philosophy (M.Phil): Commerce.

Highlights

Won best college award from Madurai Kamaraj University for the five consecutive years 1999–2004
Established: 1964
Status: Tamil Nadu State Government Aided College affiliated with the Madurai Kamaraj University
Management : Thiru. P. JABAR,
Secretary & Correspondent
M.S.S. Wakf Board College, Madurai. Wakf Board 
M.S.S. Wakf Board College is the only college in India being run by a state Wakf Board

References

Islamic universities and colleges in India
Colleges in Madurai
Educational institutions established in 1964
1964 establishments in Madras State
Colleges affiliated to Madurai Kamaraj University
Universities and colleges in Madurai